Bill Lange may refer to:

 Bill Lange (1871–1950), American baseball player
 Bill Lange (coach) (1897–1953), American basketball and football player and coach
 Bill Lange (offensive guard) (1928–1995), American football player